Para-Badminton debuted at the 2020 Summer Paralympics held in Tokyo, Japan.

Para-Badminton is a variant of the badminton for athletes with a variety of physical disabilities. The sport is governed by the Badminton World Federation (BWF) since 2011.

Leani Ratri Oktila is the all-time leader for the most Paralympic medals in badminton, with two gold and one silver; Qu Zimo and Sarina Satomi (two golds), Cheng Hefang, Liu Yutong and Lucas Mazur (one gold, one silver) each, Daiki Kajiwara and Yuma Yamazaki (one gold, one bronze), Kim Jung-jun (two silvers), Ma Huihui, Yin Menglu, Ayako Suzuki, Lee Dong-seop, and Sujirat Pookkham (one silver, one bronze) and Akiko Sugino (two bronze) are second for the most medals in badminton, each with two. Leani Ratri Oktila, Qu Zimo and Sarina Satomi are the all-time leaders for the most gold medal wins, with two.

As of the 2020 Summer Paralympics, China has been the most successful nation in badminton, winning 10 medals; 8 of them were from the women's singles and doubles tournaments. Japan (9 medals) and Indonesia (6 medals) are the only other nations to have more than five medals. As many as 42 medals (14 gold, 14 silver, and 14 bronze) have been awarded to 38 medalists from 10 NPCs.



Men

Men's singles

Men's singles WH1

Men's singles WH2

Men's singles SL3

Men's singles SL4

Men's singles SU5

Men's singles SH6

Men's doubles

Men's doubles WH1–WH2

Women's

Women's singles

Women's singles WH1

Women's singles WH2

Women's singles SL4

Women's singles SU5

Women's doubles

Women's doubles WH1–WH2

Women's doubles SL3–SU5

Mixed

Mixed doubles SL3–SU5

Statistics

Medal leaders

Medal table

Medal distribution

Men's singles

Men's singles WH1

Men's singles WH2

Men's singles SL3

Men's singles SL4

Men's singles SU5

Men's singles SH6

Women's singles

Women's singles WH1

Women's singles WH2

Women's singles SL4

Women's singles SU5

Men's doubles

Men's doubles WH1–WH2

Women's doubles

Women's doubles WH1–WH2

Women's doubles SL3–SU5

Mixed doubles

Mixed doubles SL3–SU5

Medals per year

See also
 BWF Para-Badminton World Championships

References

 
Para-badminton
Paralympics-related lists